Gliese 1062 (often GJ 1062) is a single red dwarf star in the constellation Eridanus, positioned about two degrees to the SSE of Epsilon Eridani. It is also known as LHS 20 and Ross 578. The star is invisible to the naked eye with an apparent visual magnitude of +13.0, requiring a telescope with at least a  aperture to view. It is located at a distance of 52.7 light years from the Sun based on parallax, but is drifting closer with a radial velocity of −85 km/s.

This is an M-type subdwarf star with a stellar classification of M2.5VI. It was one of the first three subdwarfs to be definitively identified by G. Kuiper in 1940, the other two being Kapteyn's Star and Wolf 1106. GJ 1062 is considered a likely member of the halo population, and thus is a MACHO.

References 

M-type subdwarfs
Eridanus (constellation)
1062
578
J03381558-1129102
TIC objects